Joe Kučera (born Josef Kučera; 8 July 1943) is a Czech jazz saxophonist and flautist.

He was born in Prague in Protectorate of Bohemia and Moravia (now the Czech Republic). He began playing clarinet at age of seventeen and later changed his instrument to saxophone and flute. Since 1967, he played with Michal Prokop's band Framus Five and two years after, he emigrated to Austria with fellow jazz musician Sammy Vomáčka. Later he went to Berlin. He worked with many musicians, such as Jackie Leven, Werner Lämmerhirt and many others. He founded jazz festival Jazz Meeting Berlin in 1997.

Discography

As leader
Balance (1986)
Dillema (1998)
Memories/Looking Back (2017)

As sideman
With Jesse Ballard
Livin' Like Fire (1977)
Jesse Ballard's Paradise Island Band (1998)
Talkin' to the Rain (2003)
Constantly in View (2007)
Cut It All Loose (2014)

With Jasmine Bonnin
Keine Angst (1979)

With Paul Esslinger
Journey to Mandalonia (1987)

With Hans Hartmann
Swindia (1984)

With Nino Hilmann
No Identity (1980)

With Ikarus
Solaris (1982)

With Werner Lämmerhirt
White Spots (1978)
Crossroads (1982)
SaitenZauber (1999, Stockfisch)
Heimspiel (2003, Toca Records)

With Jackie Leven
Control (1975 LP) 
Great Songs from Eternal Bars (2001)

With Spinning Motion
Confidence in the Future (1980)

With Michal Prokop
Blues in Soul + 9x Bonus (1995)

References

External links

1943 births
Living people
Jazz saxophonists
Jazz flautists
Czech saxophonists
Czech flautists
Musicians from Prague
21st-century saxophonists
21st-century flautists